Special Team 6 (ST6) was a European multinational police tactical unit that was formed after the Kosovo conflict in 1999 by the United Nations Interim Administration Mission in Kosovo (UNMIK). The unit's size was 21 operators seconded mostly from various European police tactical units. The unit formed a part of the United Nations Police and every member country of the United Nations could contribute to the unit. They acted as police officers and handled dangerous situations caused by Albanian and Serb ethnic violence in Kosovo. Special Team 6 handled high-risk arrests, security of diplomats, and hostage rescue.

In December 2008, Special Team 6 was renamed the EULEX IG (Intervention Group) when it transferred to the European Union Rule of Law Mission in Kosovo (EULEX) from the UNMIK and is based in Mitrovica.

Members 
ST6 personnel had to be experienced police tactical unit operators. Units that had personnel in ST6 include:

 : EKO Cobra
 : Emergency Task Force (TPS)
 : ATJ Lučko
 : URN, Zásahová jednotka KŘP Jihočeského kraje and Zásahová jednotka KŘP Plzeňského kraje
 : GIGN
 : GSG 9 and SEK 
 : Víkingasveitin
 : Delta
 : SEP
 : Piketen (Malmö)
 : WSzR Sokił UBOZ

Units or countries that have or have had personnel in EULEX IG include:

 : EKO Cobra
 : CGSU
 
 : GIGN and RAID
 : GSG 9 and SEK 
 : GIS and NOCS
 : Spec Kuopa VST
 : DSI and UIM
 : SPAP
 : DIAS
 
 : SEP
 : NI and Piketen (Malmö)

References

External links 
  Politiforum magazine article January 2006 Vier ikke ute etterå skape helter
  Aftenposten newspaper article 11 January 2006 Risikerer livet på hemmelig oppdrag
 Flashbang magazine Spring 2017 issue 8 EULEX IG

Law enforcement in Kosovo
Non-military counterterrorist organizations
Police tactical units
Rule of law missions of the European Union
United Nations Mission in Kosovo